Nicolás Suárez Callaú (1851 in Portachuelo – 1940 in Cachuela Esperanza) set up a multinational rubber empire in South America at the beginning of the 20th century.

Attracted by the rubber boom, Nicolas Suárez with his six brothers crossed the Andes at the end of the 19th century and founded Cachuela Esperanza at the rapids of Río Beni as a headquarters for the rubber export.

During the heyday of the rubber boom, his empire had branches at Acre, Manaus, Belém, and London, and Nicolás Suárez Callaú owned 80,000 square kilometres of land in the Bolivian Beni and Pando departments, 50,000 heads of cattle and 6 steamboats.

External links
Bolivian Chronicle 1876-1888 (German)

1851 births
1940 deaths
20th-century Bolivian businesspeople